Wanna Be Your Joe is the ninth studio album released from country music artist Billy Ray Cyrus. Released on July 17, 2006 on New Door Records and UMe, it was Cyrus' first country album since 2000's Southern Rain. It is also his first album of non-gospel music in three years. From Billy Ray's exposure on Hannah Montana, the album debuted and peaked at number 24 on the U.S. Billboard Top Country Albums chart, number 113 on the Billboard 200 and number 118 on the Billboard Top Comprehensive Albums. The album sold well, but no hit single was released. The title track and "I Want My Mullet Back" were released as singles, but both failed to chart on the U.S. Billboard Hot Country Songs chart.

Content
The album features collaborations with Cyrus' daughter, Miley Cyrus, and a song with George Jones and Loretta Lynn. The song with Miley, "Stand", was made into a music video, but was not released as a single. "Country Music Has the Blues" is the song with Jones and Lynn; it was co-written with Cyrus' son, Trace Cyrus, lead singer for the pop group, Metro Station.

On the track "The Freebird Fell", Cyrus co-wrote the song with Lynyrd Skynyrd guitarist Ed King and drummer Artimus Pyle. Also, fellow country singer Mark Collie contributes to the track "What About Us"; co-written with Cyrus and Terry Shelton.

Also, the album has two hidden tracks. The song "Without You" was originally on Cyrus' 2000 album Southern Rain, but was not released as a single. "One Night" is the second hidden track. It was originally a UK Singles Chart number-one single for Elvis Presley in 1958.

Reception

AllMusic gave the album 3.5 stars out of 5. Although they said the album had been labored over and revised. 
On the one hand, there's a collection of romantic ballads — "Wanna Be Your Joe," "I Wouldn't Be Me," "What About Us," "I Wonder," "Lonely Wins," "How've Ya Been," and "Ole What's Her Name" — that run the gamut from sincere pledges of commitment to expressions of frustration and outright kiss-offs.

The album debuted at number 113 on the Billboard 200, number 118 on the Top Comprehensive Albums and number 24 on the Top Country Albums chart, where it stayed at the peak position for two consecutive weeks. Although the title track was released on June 6, 2006, it failed to chart on the country music charts. A second single, "I Want My Mullet Back," was released later in 2006, but it also failed to chart. Cyrus left New Door Records by the end of 2006 and signed with Walt Disney Records, due to the lackluster success of the album and its singles.

Track listing

Personnel
 Maxwell Abrams - saxophone
 David Briggs - keyboards
 Pat Buchanan - electric guitar
 David J. Carpenter - bass guitar
 Billy Ray Cyrus - acoustic guitar, lead vocals, background vocals
 Miley Cyrus - duet vocals on "Stand"
 Andy Dodd - electric guitar, keyboards
 Dan Dugmore - steel guitar, lap steel guitar
 Jennifer Duncan - background vocals
 Lee Hendricks - bass guitar
 Corky Holbrook - bass guitar
 George Jones - vocals on "Country Music Has the Blues"
 Loretta Lynn - vocals on "Country Music Had the Blues"
 Brent Mason - electric guitar
 Greg Morrow - drums
 Leslie Patterson - background vocals
 Dave Pomeroy - bass guitar
 Terry Shelton - acoustic guitar, electric guitar, drums
 Barton Stevens - accordion, horns, keyboards
 Adam Watts - drums, acoustic guitar, background vocals
 John Willis - acoustic guitar

Chart performance

Album
The album debuted at number 24 on the Billboard Top Country Albums chart in 2006, number 113 on the all-genre Billboard 200 chart and number 118 on the all-genre Billboard Top Comprehensive Albums chart, even after failing to release a hit single to county radio.

Singles

References

2006 albums
Billy Ray Cyrus albums